Anthony James Fryklund (born March 26, 1971) is an American retired professional mixed martial artist who last competed in the Lightweight division. A professional competitor from 1997 until 2013, he competed for the UFC, the WEC, Bellator, Strikeforce, Cage Rage, and Titan FC.

Background
Born and raised in Boston, Massachusetts, Fryklund was adopted when he was three months old. He began Boxing and Kickboxing when he was 13, and was often drawn into fights that arose when he tried to defend victims of bullying. He attended Winchester High School and also began Kenpo Karate in his late teens, eventually earning a Black Belts in Japanese Jujutsu and Shotokan Karate. He later attended Northeastern University and spent two years in the United States Coast Guard, but did not finish his education as he was focused on his job, which was working as a safety manager for a construction company.

Mixed martial arts career

Early career
Fryklund made his professional MMA debut in 1997, fighting twice at UFC 14. During the first five years of his career, he built up a record of 8 wins and 1 loss.

In Starting 2003, Fryklund fought a who's who of MMA fighters including David Loiseau, Brian Ebersole, Eugene Jackson, Matt Lindland, Ivan Salaverry, and Anderson Silva. His loss to Silva was one of the highlight reel KOs from the British Cage Rage promotion as Fryklund fell to an unconventional reverse elbow.

Strikeforce
In 2006, Fryklund joined the Strikeforce promotion. He lost both fights there against Duane Ludwig in December 2006 and against Cung Le in June 2007.

Bellator Fighting Championships
Fryklund returned to fighting after a nearly six-year hiatus as he faced Patrick Cenoble at Bellator 94 on March 28, 2013. The bout was ruled a draw after Cenoble was docked one point in round two.

Mixed martial arts record

|-
| Draw
| align=center| 
| Patrick Cenoble
| Draw (split)
| Bellator 94
| 
| align=center| 3
| align=center| 5:00
| Tampa, Florida, United States
| 
|-
| Loss
| align=center| 14–9
| Cung Le
| KO (punch)
| Strikeforce: Shamrock vs. Baroni
| 
| align=center| 3
| align=center| 0:25
| San Jose, California, United States
| 
|-
| Loss
| align=center| 14–8
| Duane Ludwig
| TKO (knee)
| Strikeforce: Triple Threat
| 
| align=center| 2
| align=center| 3:37
| San Jose, California, United States
| 
|-
| Loss
| align=center| 14–7
| Thomas Denny
| Submission (rear-naked choke)
| BIB: Beatdown in Bakersfield
| 
| align=center| 1
| align=center| 1:32
| Bakersfield, California, United States
|
|-
| Win
| align=center| 14–6
| Alex Reid
| Submission (heel hook)
| Cage Rage 18
| 
| align=center| 1
| align=center| 1:32
| London, England
| 
|-
| Win
| align=center| 13–6
| Brian Dunn
| KO (punch)
| Titan FC 4
| 
| align=center| 1
| align=center| N/A
| Kansas City, Kansas, United States
| 
|-
| Win
| align=center| 12–6
| Tommy Gouge
| TKO (submission to punches)
| Titan FC 3
| 
| align=center| 1
| align=center| N/A
| Durant, Oklahoma, United States
| 
|-
| Loss
| align=center| 11–6
| Anderson Silva
| KO (reverse elbow)
| Cage Rage 16
| 
| align=center| 1
| align=center| 2:02
| London, England
| 
|-
| Loss
| align=center| 11–5
| Jonathan Goulet
| TKO (cut)
| TKO 20: Champion vs Champion
| 
| align=center| 1
| align=center| 1:16
| Montreal, Quebec, Canada
|
|-
| Loss
| align=center| 11–4
| Ivan Salaverry
| Submission (body triangle)
| UFC 50
| 
| align=center| 1
| align=center| 1:36
| Atlantic City, New Jersey, United States
| 
|-
| Win
| align=center| 11–3
| Chris Myers
| TKO
| APEX: Genesis
| 
| align=center| 2
| align=center| 4:20
| Montreal, Quebec, Canada
| 
|-
| Loss
| align=center| 10–3
| Matt Lindland
| Decision (unanimous)
| ROTR 5: Rumble on the Rock 5
| 
| align=center| 3
| align=center| 5:00
| Honolulu, Hawaii, United States
| 
|-
| Win
| align=center| 10–2
| Eugene Jackson
| Technical Submission (guillotine choke)
| Battleground 1: War Cry
| 
| align=center| 1
| align=center| 3:38
| Chicago, Illinois, United States
|
|-
| Win
| align=center| 9–2
| Brian Ebersole
| Submission (achilles lock)
| Dangerzone: Dakota Destruction
| 
| align=center| 2
| align=center| 4:37
| New Town, North Dakota, United States
| 
|-
| Loss
| align=center| 8–2
| David Loiseau
| TKO (cut)
| UCC 12: Adrenaline
| 
| align=center| 1
| align=center| 4:24
| Quebec, Canada
|
|-
| Win
| align=center| 8–1
| Zach Light
| Submission (kimura)
| WEC 4
| 
| align=center| 1
| align=center| 4:06
| Uncasville, Connecticut, United States
| 
|-
| Win
| align=center| 7–1
| Rodrigo Ruas
| TKO (punches)
| UFC 37.5
| 
| align=center| 2
| align=center| 3:34
| Las Vegas, Nevada, United States
|
|-
| Win
| align=center| 6–1
| Jonathan Goulet
| KO (punches)
| UCC 8: Fast and Furious
| 
| align=center| 1
| align=center| 3:45
| Quebec, Canada
|
|-
| Win
| align=center| 5–1
| Adrian Serrano
| KO (punches)
| UW: Horn vs Wikan
| 
| align=center| 2
| align=center| 3:18
| Minnesota, United States
| 
|-
| Win
| align=center| 4–1
| Marty Armendarez
| Submission (guillotine choke)
| Shogun 1: Shogun 1
| 
| align=center| 2
| align=center| 0:47
| Honolulu, Hawaii, United States
| 
|-
| Win
| align=center| 3–1
| Jeremiah O'Neal
| Submission (guillotine choke)
| EC 44: Extreme Challenge 44
| 
| align=center| 1
| align=center| 0:53
| Lake Charles, Louisiana, United States
| 
|-
| Win
| align=center| 2–1
| Cris Custer
| Submission (guillotine choke)
| RSF 2: Attack at the Track
| 
| align=center| 2
| align=center| 1:30
| Chester, West Virginia, United States
| 
|-
| Loss
| align=center| 1–1
| Kevin Jackson
| Submission (choke)
| rowspan=2|UFC 14
| rowspan=2|
| align=center| 1
| align=center| 0:44
| rowspan=2|Birmingham, Alabama, United States
| 
|-
| Win
| align=center| 1–0
| Donnie Chappell
| Submission (choke)
| align=center| 1
| align=center| 1:31
|

References

External links

Living people
American male mixed martial artists
Welterweight mixed martial artists
Middleweight mixed martial artists
Mixed martial artists utilizing boxing
Mixed martial artists utilizing Shotokan
Mixed martial artists utilizing Brazilian jiu-jitsu
Mixed martial artists from Massachusetts
American male karateka
American practitioners of Brazilian jiu-jitsu
People awarded a black belt in Brazilian jiu-jitsu
Sportspeople from Boston
1971 births
Winchester High School (Massachusetts) alumni
Ultimate Fighting Championship male fighters